Melpomene is a genus of funnel weavers first described by O. Pickard-Cambridge in 1898. Roth and Brame noted that, with many undescribed species, the genus appears to be a catchall or "wastebasket taxon" for several unrelated species that may represent several genera.

Species
 it contains thirteen species:

Melpomene bicavata (F. O. Pickard-Cambridge, 1902) – Mexico
Melpomene chamela Maya-Morales & Jiménez, 2017 – Mexico
Melpomene chiricana Chamberlin & Ivie, 1942 – Panama
Melpomene coahuilana (Gertsch & Davis, 1940) – Mexico
Melpomene elegans O. Pickard-Cambridge, 1898 – Mexico
Melpomene panamana (Petrunkevitch, 1925) – Panama
Melpomene penetralis (F. O. Pickard-Cambridge, 1902) – Costa Rica
Melpomene plesia Chamberlin & Ivie, 1942 – Panama
Melpomene quadrata (Kraus, 1955) – El Salvador
Melpomene rita (Chamberlin & Ivie, 1941) – USA
Melpomene singula (Gertsch & Ivie, 1936) – Mexico
Melpomene solisi Maya-Morales & Jiménez, 2017 – Mexico
Melpomene transversa (F. O. Pickard-Cambridge, 1902) – Mexico

References

Agelenidae
Spiders of North America
Araneomorphae genera